The Saint Martial School was a medieval school of music composition centered in the Abbey of Saint Martial, Limoges, France. Most active from the 9th to 12th centuries, some scholars describe its practices, music, and manuscripts as 'Aquitanian'. It is known for the composition of tropes, sequences, and early organum. In this respect, it was an important precursor to the Notre Dame School. Adémar de Chabannes and his nephew Roger de Chabannes were important proponents of this school.

History of the Abbey Saint Martial de Limoges 

Many of the modern musicological studies concerning a "Saint Martial School" focus on four manuscripts with remarkably innovative compositions for the 12th century. It is often assumed that these fragments derived from different Southern French monasteries, despite the lack of cantor attributions in the rubrics. However, Sarah Fuller has suggested that this may not be the case, discussing the "myth of a Saint Martial school", where she suggests that the fragments are rather a collective activity of the Abbey's librarians than a didactic activity of the Abbey's cantors. These manuscripts (F-Pn lat. 1139, 3549, 3719, and GB-Lbl Add MS 36881) were, it would seem, more likely collected and bound together by the librarian Bernard Itier, than composed or compiled at St Martial itself. Despite the concordances between these manuscripts, the collection includes many variants. The repertory combines modern forms of poetry with modern forms of musical composition, consisting of settings of proses, tropes, sequences, liturgical dramas, and organa. Even a polyphonic setting of an epistle recitation survives as florid organum. Other modern musicological studies have attempted to identify unifying centre for these sources, such as Cluny rather than Limoges, and with reference to the Cluniac Monastic Association, Fleury and Paris (especially the Notre-Dame School), the  Abbey of Saint Denis, and the Abbey Saint-Maur-des-Fossés. Questions about periphery and centre may be answered by the research of political and church history relative to Cluny. In contrast to Fuller's study, James Grier's recent examination of earlier monophonic Proser-Sequentiaries suggests that they were created in the scriptorium of the Abbey Saint-Martial 100 years earlier (than the fore-mentioned fragments including polyphonic compositions), explicitly for liturgical use at Limoges, by Roger and Adémar de Chabannes. The concept of a local school of cantors who documented their innovations in newly designed liturgical books with the libellum structure—later imitated elsewhere (even in the Parisian Magnus liber organi)—is therefore still credible; at least for the 11th century.

Roger and Adémar de Chabannes and the troper-sequentiary 

Adémar de Chabannes was educated as a cantor and poet by his uncle Roger de Chabannes. The manuscripts written or revised by Roger de Chabannes together with his nephew, were created in the form of troper-prosers and sequentiaries with a new diastematic form of neume notation (F-Pn lat. 1240, 1120, 1121, 909), which became soon much more popular than the letter notation of William of Volpiano. They belonged to a new type of chant book which was no longer simply a liturgical book, but rather collected new poetry based on liturgical forms (in music as well as in poetry). This new form of chant book consisted of several books ("libelli") - the "proser" or "troper" for verses and tropes, the "sequentiary" for prosulae and sequences (troped elaborated alleluia refrains), the processional with processional antiphons, the offertorial for offertories etc. and the tonary. This new structural form soon spread beyond Aquitaine becoming popular in France and Normandy, due in part to the Cluniac Monastic Order, which was expanding its influence and adopted the work of the school of cantors at the Abbey of Saint-Martial for liturgical use. Cluny Abbey was founded by William I and already in Adémar's time its laic association had gained its power over more and more abbeys, their cantors and their scriptoriums. Adémar's fruitless efforts to become an abbot at Saint Cybard of Angoulême was a personal disappointment, but his ambitions were quite symptomatic for monasteries under Cluniac influence.

According to James Grier, Adémar de Chabannes also contributed within two troper-sequentiaries (F-Pn lat. 1121, 909) which have the finest tonaries of the region. He regards this late activity as a craftship which he learnt from his uncle, while he was revising older manuscripts, often by adding modal signatures to earlier manuscripts. But the intonation formulas of the tonaries had as well an explicit creative function, which can be demonstrated by an earlier manuscript already written in diastematic neumes. Some composed sequences of this earlier troper-proser-sequentiary  (F-Pn lat. 1118, fol. 114r) are nothing else than a simple repetition of a more and more elaborated intonation, but the verse units cut the melodic motive into different parts, often against its modal structure. These early permutation technique already anticipated later isorhythmic composition techniques.

Early polyphony and the Cluniac influence on liturgical reforms 
The scriptorium of Limoges continued its activities after Adémar's death in 1034, but it was no longer the only scriptorium of the Limousin diocese. William Sherrill made the hypothesis, that the Gradual of St Yrieix with Gallican preces in its appendix (F-Pn lat. 903) has not been written at Limoges, but by the cantors of the Abbey itself which was possible since it promoted as canon chapter during the second half of the 11th century and depended directly of the Monastery of St Martin at Tours. He even went so far to assume that this gradual has copied from Beneventan graduals, because the included Cassinese chants for the patronal feast of St Benedict, and might have served to copy for the gradual of Gaillac, while the latter could have served to write the later gradual for Toulouse. In this comparison the liturgy of the Saint-Martial Gradual (F-Pn lat. 1132) is rather dependent on Cluniac reforms and especially the one of Narbonne, written by the end of the 11th century for the use at the cathedral, resembles to many others written with the same notation in Spain after the conquest of Northern Andalusia, when Aquitanian aristocrats had been related with the Castilian family by marriage.

Polyphony was neither invented at Limoges nor did it appear the first time in the notation of its scriptorium. An oral tradition of a polyphonic performance can be traced back to the time, when the Musica enchiriadis had been written, and Adémar was a contemporary of Guido of Arezzo, who described in his treatise Micrologus a similar practice as "diaphonia" (discant), which already allowed to sing more than one note against the cantus during cadences ("occursus"). Notated evidence of alternative practices, where the organal voice changes between different strategies of heterophony (parallel and counter movement) and holding notes which support the modal colour of the cantus, can be found as later added exemplification in monophonic manuscripts of the Abbeys in Saint-Maur-des-Fossés, Fleury, and Chartres. One example concerning the tradition of Fleury Abbey is an addition of an organal voice (similar to the organum notation of the Winchester Troper) in a hagiographic Lectionary (V-CVbav Cod. Reg. lat. 586, fol. 87v) for three Mass graduals «Viderunt omnes» (Christmas), «Omnes de Saba» (Epiphany), and «Gloriosus deus» (Fabianus and Sebastianus). The local style of the cantors were counter movement and holding notes with the syntactic structure underlined by occursus endings. The only exception was Winchester Cathedral, where a systematic collection of organa can be found in the troper part—the so-called "Winchester Troper". The earliest polyphony developed in a rather secular context and Cluny played a prominent role in it.

What was exactly the role of the Abbey of Saint Martial for a school of anonymous cantors associated with Aquitanian polyphony?

The earliest evidence can be found in an older Troper-Proser with libellum structure (F-Pn lat. 1120). In some late additions cantors made exemplifications of a polyphonic performance of organum similar to those additions in the Gradual of the Abbey of Saint-Maur-des-Fossés (F-Pn lat. 12584, fol. 306). Under Cluniac influence the latter abbey developed an extravagant liturgy since 1006, when it was ruled by a new Abbot, who was sent from Cluny, where he had served as a cantor. The polyphony can be easily recognized, because the notator used a method similar to a modern score.

There had been other methods as well. Some later additions in the early Troper-Proser (F-Pn lat. 1120) on folio 73v and on 77v look monophonic on the first sight, but the melody is organized in pairs so that each verse of it has to be sung together with an organum voice. The organum voice simply sings the text of the first verse with the melody notated with the text of the second one, and the cantus does vice versa repeat the melody of the first verse, while the singers applies it to the text of the second verse. On folio 81r and 105r we have three early examples of later added florid organum. Its notation technique had already developed in the monophonic manuscripts notated in parts by Adémar, in cases where the scribe of the text did not leave enough space for the neumes. The notator already used vertical strokes, which do indicate how the melismas have been coordinated with the syllables. On folio 105 recto, a «Benedicamus domino» was notated separately from the florid organum.

Both techniques of polyphonic performance, the punctum contra punctum (discant) and florid organum as puncta contra punctum have been once discussed in a 15th-century treatise from Italy, which had been obviously associated with the treatise "Ad organum faciendum" of Aquitanian provenance.

The manuscripts of Aquitanian polyphony 
In comparison with the few late traces of a polyphonic singing in the earlier manuscripts, the four main manuscripts and a lot of similar manuscripts of Aquitaine are so full of later developments, that their manifold forms, the calligraphy, the illuminations, and the poetry have not lost their attraction for philologists and musicians.

A well-known example is «Stirps iesse», which is nothing else than a florid organum over a «Benedicamus domino» cantus which was widespread within the Cluniac Monastic Association including the Magnus liber organi of the Notre-Dame school. As «Benedicamus domino» verses concluded almost every divine service, Cluniac cantors were supposed to know a great variety of them. Many of them had been new compositions and became favored subjects for new experiments in poetry and musical composition. Florid organum itself like any tropus can be regarded in two ways, as a useful exercise to memorize a certain cantus precisely note by note on the one hand or, as a very refined and embellished performance by a well-skilled soloist or precentor. «Stirps iesse» was actually a combination of both, as a Benedicamus performed «cum organo» it was rather a longer performance during an important liturgical feast, but the troped organal voice added a certain Marian poem to it, which fixed it within the week between Christmas and New Year.

The manuscripts "Saint-Martial C" und "D" even were nothing more than additional quaternia within a homiletic collection of sermons. Most of the manuscripts with polyphonic compositions are not just from the Abbey of Saint-Martial at Limoges, but as well from other places of Aquitaine. It is unknown to what extent these manuscripts reflect the products of Saint Martial in particular, it rather seems that there were prosar collections from various places in Southern France.

During the 12th century, only a very few composers of the school are known by name, and the new poetic experiments were not only in Latin, they obviously inspired as well courtly poetry of the Troubadours. Even if St-Martial poetry (versus, tropes and sequences) was almost entirely in Latin, some melodies collected in the manuscripts of the Abbey were also used to compose Old Occitan poetry. Before the collections of the chansonniers, there are already contemporary Old Occitan songs with musical notation for all stanzas which has been written at the scriptory of Saint-Martial Abbey like O Maria, Deu maire. It shows that aristocratic circles present at the Abbey have been closely related to those of the troubadours.

References

Citations

Sources 

 

 
 
 
 

 

 

 
  See description at DIAMM.

Studies 

 

  

 

Composition schools
French music history
Limoges
Music organizations based in France
Medieval music genres